The 2019–20 Duke Blue Devils men's basketball team represented Duke University during the 2019–20 NCAA Division I men's basketball season. They were coached by 40th-year head coach, Mike Krzyzewski. The Blue Devils played their home games at Cameron Indoor Stadium in Durham, North Carolina, as a member of the Atlantic Coast Conference.

The Blue Devils finished the season 25–6, and 15–5 in ACC play.  The team was scheduled to play NC State in the quarterfinals of the ACC tournament before the tournament was cancelled due to the COVID-19 pandemic.  The NCAA tournament was also cancelled due to the pandemic.  Many Tournament Simulations ran to see who would've won it all.  One of the Simulations, Wolverine Studios Draft Day Sports had Duke winning the 2020 National Championship.

Previous season
The Blue Devils finished the 2018–19 season 32–6, 14–4 in ACC play to finish in second place. They won the ACC Tournament title, the school's 21st tournament championship. As a result, they received the conference's automatic bid to the NCAA tournament as the overall No. 1 seed in the East region. There they defeated North Dakota State, UCF, and Virginia Tech to advance to the Elite Eight where they lost to No. 2 seed Michigan State.

Offseason

Departures

2019 recruiting class

2020 Recruiting class

Roster

Projected depth chart

Schedule and results
Source:

|-
!colspan=9 style=| Exhibition

|-
!colspan=9 style=| Regular season

|-
!colspan=12 style=| ACC tournament

Rankings

*AP does not release post-NCAA Tournament rankings^Coaches did not release a week 2 poll

References

2019–20 Atlantic Coast Conference men's basketball season
2019-20
2019 in sports in North Carolina
2020 in sports in North Carolina